The , also called the , is the official military history of Imperial Japan's involvement in the Pacific War from 1937 to 1945. The task of compiling the official account of the Japanese involvement in World War II began in October 1955 with the opening of the War History Office (the present Military History Department of the “National Institute for Defense Studies”, or NIDS, of Japan's Ministry of Defense in Tokyo, Japan). Its main function was to serve as educational research material for the Self-Defense Forces. The office was led by Colonel Nishiura Susumu, a senior official in the War Ministry during the war. The publisher was Asagumo Shimbunsha.

The history, comprising 102 volumes, the first of which was published in 1966 and the final one in 1980, was compiled from Imperial Japanese Army, Imperial Japanese Navy, other Japanese government records, and personal diaries and records which survived Japan's defeat in the war.  Many of the records were initially confiscated by Allied governments, mainly the United States, but were returned to Japan in 1958. The 102 numbered volumes of the series include 37 volumes on the Imperial Headquarters, 34 volumes on army campaigns, 21 volumes on navy campaigns, nine volumes about air services campaigns, and one volume of chronology. In 1985 and 1986 two supplemental unnumbered volumes were published.

English translations 
The work provides information and details on Japanese organization and operations in the whole Pacific Theater of Operations. Currently, only a limited number of volumes were translated, making it difficult for Western historians who do not read Japanese to make use of the information in western studies of the Pacific War.

By the Corts Foundation
Two volumes (Vol. 3 "Occupation of Dutch East Indies" and Vol. 26 "The Operations of the Navy in the Dutch East Indies and the Bay of Bengal") have been translated into English by The Corts Foundation. The Foundation is currently translating one additional volume (Vol. 34 "Army Air Drive to the Southern Pacific") into English. These translations focuses specifically on the volumes relevant to the study of the Japanese attack on and the subsequent occupation of the former Dutch East Indies in the period of 1941 to 1945.

By Australian War Memorial
There is another translation by The Australian War Memorial, "Japanese army operations in the South Pacific Area: New Britain and Papua campaigns, 1942–43". This book is a translation of portions of volumes 14 ("Army Operations in the South Pacific: Port Moresby to the First Phase of Guadalcanal, pt. 1") and 28 ("Army Operations in the South Pacific: Guadalcanal - Buna Operations, pt. 2") of the Senshi sôsho, covering the invasion of Rabaul, the battles along the Kokoda Trail and at Milne Bay, and the destruction of the Japanese forces at Buna, Gona and Giruwa in northern Papua.

Digital Japanese edition 
In December 2018, all updated and corrected volumes became available online at NIDS Library & Historical records Search System.

Notes

References

Empire of Japan
Military history of Japan during World War II
Japanese non-fiction literature
Books about military history
Series of history books about World War II
Official military history books